Krieg dem Kriege! Guerre à la Guerre! War against War! Oorlog aan den Oorlog! is a book by Ernst Friedrich, published for the first time in 1924. It examines the human cost of the First World War and shows the true face of war (injuries, mutilations, executions, suffering, misery and death). The original version written in four languages (German, French, English, Dutch) has since been translated into 50+ languages.

Description 
The German pacifist Ernst Friedrich wished to enlighten people with this book by demonstrating the horrors of the First World War. The work becomes a "pacifist bible" that rallies the movement under the slogan "No more war."

Following the principle that a picture is worth a thousand words, the book makes use of images of war. One picture shows toys imitating weapons of war, below a caption reads : "Do not give these toys to your children!" It denounces the euphemistic language of war propaganda by pairing these words with violent photographs from the battlefield. A picture entitled "The field of honour" shows the naked corpse of a soldier dead from typhoid, interred in a hole in the ground. Another shows a mass of bodies collected in a ditch intended to be a mass grave, with the title "The Heroes' Tomb." The juxtapositions turn the jingoistic language into sarcastic commentary. 

The book shows soldiers and their battlefield mutilations. It shows a bedridden soldier with the mouth and lower jaw completely torn off. Friedrich quotes Marshal Paul Von Hindenburg: "War treats me like a spa bath!" Another quotes the words of Count von Moltke: "The most noble virtues of people are exposed in war!"

Selected publication history 

 Krieg dem Kriege! Berlin: Freie Jugend, 1924. First edition. 
 Krieg dem Kriege! / Bd. 1 Krieg dem Kriege! = Guerre à la guerre! = War against war! = Vojnu vojně! Berlin: Freie Jugend, 1926. 8th-10th editions. Includes German, French, Dutch, English and Czech.  
 Krieg dem Kriege! Frankfurt am Main : Zweitausendeins, 1981. Includes German, Dutch, and English.  
 Krieg dem Kriege. Berlin: Anti-Kriegs-Museum Berlin, 2015.

References

External links
 Ernst Friedrich, Krieg dem Kriege - online edition

1924 non-fiction books
Anti-war books
Photojournalistic books
Photography controversies
World War I books